The Hundred-Mile Wilderness is the section of the Appalachian Trail running between Abol Bridge just south of Baxter State Park and Monson in the state of Maine.  It is generally considered the wildest section of the Appalachian Trail,  and one of the most challenging to navigate and traverse. This section of the trail is crossed by several logging roads and is maintained by the Maine Appalachian Trail Club. It consists of a small corridor of protected wilderness surrounded by large tracts of public and private land controlled by paper companies. An increasing amount of the adjoining lands are being protected by groups like the Appalachian Mountain Club and the Nature Conservancy.

In 2000, a series of new logging roads and a marked side-trail offered hikers re-supply and lodging opportunities between miles 55 and 65 heading northbound from Monson.

References

See also
Maine Island Trail

Protected areas of Piscataquis County, Maine
Appalachian Trail